The Master Hand is a 1915 silent film drama directed by Harley Knoles and starring Nat C. Goodwin. It is based on a 1907 play The Master Hand by Carroll Fleming. It was released by World Film Company.

Cast
Nat C. Goodwin - John Bigelow
Theodore Babcock - James Rallston
Julia Stuart - Mrs. Rallston
Florence Malone - Jean Rallston
Carroll Fleming - Ed Pembroke
Alex Calvert - Dr. Garside
Clarissa Selwynne - Miss Lane, the lady doctor
Katherine Lee - Dot
Madge Evans - Jean as a child

Preservation status
Only a fragment of the film remains between two archives the Library of Congress and the National Archives of Canada(Ottawa).
Prints and/or fragments were found in the Dawson Film Find in 1978.

References

External links
 The Master Hand at IMDb.com

1915 films
American silent feature films
Films directed by Harley Knoles
World Film Company films
American black-and-white films
Silent American drama films
1915 drama films
1910s American films